NFL Network Exclusive Game Series (formerly called NFL Network Special) is the branding currently used for broadcasts of National Football League (NFL) games aired by NFL Network. Prior to the 2022 NFL season, the NFL Network Special branding was only used on Thursday Night Football (TNF) games not played on Thursdays (from 2022 on it is used for all games); as of 2022, this arrangement has included at least one NFL London Game played in a Sunday morning (U.S. time) window, and one or more late-season games on Saturdays.

After having briefly used Saturday Night Football to brand the games (alongside the overall blanket title Run to the Playoffs), from 2008 through 2016 the games were branded as "special editions" of Thursday Night Football or a variant thereof (such as Thursday Night Special), and later NFL Network Special. The branding NFL Christmas Special has also been used for Christmas Day games in the TNF package, some of which having fallen into this segment of the package Since 2014, the majority of these games have been produced by the current Thursday Night Football sub-licensee, such as CBS (2014–2017), NBC (2016–2017), and Fox (2018–2021).

In the 2022 season, Thursday Night Football moved exclusively to Amazon Prime Video. NFL Network will still carry a package of exclusive games, consisting mainly of international games and late-season Saturday games, with the Thursday Night Football-centric branding having been dropped and replaced by individual brands for each game (such as Saturday Showdown for the late-season tripleheader).

As with all league games carried by a cable network or streaming provider, each game is syndicated to a local broadcast station (or two stations in some cases) in the markets of the two teams, per NFL broadcast rules.

Background

Prior to 2017
NFL Network debuted Thursday Night Football on November 23, 2006, with the Kansas City Chiefs handing the visiting Denver Broncos a 19–10 Thanksgiving defeat. As part of this package, three games aired on Saturday nights, which were accordingly branded as Saturday Night Football (not to be confused with ESPN/ABC's college football telecasts of the same name, which ESPN holds a trademark in relation to), with the package as a whole being promoted as the Run to the Playoffs. This format carried over to the 2007 season. Saturday games can only occur in the final weeks of the season, as the Sports Broadcasting Act of 1961, requires blackouts of professional football games—held on Friday evenings or Saturdays from mid-September through mid-December—on television stations within  of the venue of a college or high school football game.

Starting in 2008, NFL Network eliminated all but one of the Saturday night games and started their Thursday night package three weeks earlier. In the following season, all references to Saturday Night Football were dropped, with these games now being referred to as a "special edition" of Thursday Night Football.

Beginning in 2014, the Thursday Night Football package has been sub-licensed to one or more of the NFL's broadcast partners, who produces all games on behalf of NFL Network, and may simulcast selected games in the package on broadcast television. These have, by extension, included the non-Thursday games of the package, which were in turn produced by CBS (with some later produced by NBC beginning in 2016). These games are intended to satisfy NFL Network's carriage agreements, which require that a quota of exclusive games be broadcast by the channel each season, while still allowing some of the games to be simulcast on network television as well.

In 2014, CBS used the branding Thursday Night Football: Saturday Edition for these games—a branding scheme that was especially considered a misnomer when used for a game aired on a Saturday afternoon. By 2016, the games had begun to carry the on-air branding Thursday Night Special (albeit with some fleeting references to Thursday Night Football or TNF still present in on-air graphics), with Christmas Day games assigned to the Thursday Night Football package accordingly using the branding NFL Christmas Special.

2017–2021
By the 2017 season, the branding NFL Network Special was adopted for non-Thursday TNF games exclusive to NFL Network. The games continue to have similar productions to games aired under the Thursday Night Football title, but with their on-air graphics only containing NFL Network branding (rather than being co-branded with the logos of both NFL Network and the host broadcaster).

Beginning in 2018, most NFL Network Special games became Fox productions as part of its new rights to Thursday Night Football. An exception was an NFL London Game on October 10, 2021, which was instead produced by CBS.

2022–present 
Amazon Prime Video holds rights to Thursday Night Football beginning in the 2022 NFL season. There will still be a package of exclusive games on NFL Network, generally consisting of international games airing at 9:30 a.m. ET, and late-season Saturday games. The Thursday Night Football-centric branding was also dropped, with NFL Network now marketing the broadcasts as its "exclusive game series", and branding the late-season Saturday games with distinct titles such as Saturday Showdown (Week 15 tripleheader), and the Holiday Classic (Christmas Eve primetime game, Week 16).

Coverage

Results

Announcers

Play-by-play
Greg Gumbel (2017, 2021)
Mike Tirico (2017–2019)
Rich Eisen (2018–2019, 2022)
Curt Menefee (2018)
Kevin Burkhardt (2019, 2021)
Adam Amin (2020)
Joe Davis (2020–2021)
Kevin Kugler (2022)
Noah Eagle (2022)

Color
Trent Green (2017)
Kurt Warner (2017–2022)
Michael Irvin (2018–2019, 2022)
Steve Mariucci (2018–2019, 2022)
Nate Burleson (2018–2019, 2022)
Joe Thomas (2019)
Charles Davis (2019)
Mark Schlereth (2020)
Adam Archuleta (2021)
Greg Olsen (2021)
Mark Sanchez (2022)

Reporters
Jamie Erdahl (2017, 2022)
Heather Cox (2017)
Melissa Stark (2018–2021)
Peter Schrager (2018–2019, 2021–2022)
Pam Oliver (2019, 2021)
Lindsay Czarniak (2020, 2022)
A.J. Ross (2021)
Steve Wyche (2021–2022)
Laura Okmin (2022)
Stacey Dales (2022)
Sara Walsh (2022)
Tom Pelissero (2022)
Allison Williams (2022)

See also
 NFL on Fox
 NFL on CBS
 NFL on NBC
 NBC Sunday Night Football
 Monday Night Football
 MLB Network Showcase
 NHL Network Showcase

References

External links
 
 

 
2017 American television series debuts
2010s American television series
2020s American television series
CBS Sports
NFL on NBC
NFL Network original programming
Simulcasts